The 1375 Yellow River flood was a natural disaster affecting the area around Kaifeng, China during the early Ming dynasty. Contemporary sources mentioned a death toll of between 15,000 and 25 people, most of them farmers. The philosopher Wang Yangming mentioned the 1375 Yellow River flood as an example of how even a virtuous man can be destroyed by the power of nature.

References

History of Kaifeng
Disasters in Ming dynasty
Kaifeng Flood, 1375
Yellow River Flood, 1375
Yellow River floods
14th-century floods